Shaw v. Reno, 509 U.S. 630 (1993), was a landmark United States Supreme Court case in the area of redistricting and racial gerrymandering. After the 1990 census, North Carolina qualified to have a 12th district and drew it in a distinct snake-like manner in order to create a “majority-minority” Black district. From there, Ruth O. Shaw sued this proposed plan with the argument that this 12th district was unconstitutional and violated the Fourteenth Amendment under the clause of equal protection. In contrast, Reno, the Attorney General, argued that the district would allow for minority groups to have a voice in elections. In the decision, the court ruled in a 5–4 majority that redistricting based on race must be held to a standard of strict scrutiny under the equal protection clause and on the basis that it violated the fourteenth Amendment because it was drawn solely based on race.

Shaw v. Reno was an influential case and received backlash. Some southern states filed against majority-Black districts. This decision played a role in deciding many future cases, including Bush v. Vera and Miller v. Johnson. However, the phrasing of irregularly drawn districts has left room for much interpretation, letting judges use their opinions rather than relying on Shaw.

History 

Gerrymandering

To contextualize the Shaw supreme court case, gerrymandering is the redrawing of electoral districts to help give a political advantage. Through this process, political parties can draw the boundaries of districts to favor their party's candidate as they allow for extra seats to be won. The census marks when states can redraw their congressional district lines and in accordance with the Voting Rights Act of 1965, districts must be redrawn equally populated. With new technology and tactics of packing and cracking, gerrymandering has become easier through the years but within gerrymandering, limitations exist. Gerrymandering has come before the Supreme Court in multiple cases but in Shaw, racial gerrymandering refers to Section 2 of the Voting Rights Act. Section 2 of this act opposes using discriminatory voting practices in the election process and that in itself prohibits gerrymandering based on race.

Racial Background

In 1870, following the Civil war and the abolishment of slavery, the 15th amendment was passed, giving all United States citizens the right to vote regardless of race, color, or previous conditions of servitude. This amendment ensured the voting rights of African Americans. However, after its enactment, many southern states began implementing new ways to bar African Americans from voting. Some of these methods included poll taxes, which many could not afford, literacy tests, that many could not pass, and grandfather clauses, which stated that one can only vote if their grandfather voted. This changed  with the passing of the Voting Rights Act of 1965, which outlawed these racially discriminatory practices and required government supervision for states that had less than 50 percent of non-White citizens registered to vote. If any state wanted to change any voting rules, they had to receive pre-clearance to ensure no new rule was racist. The Voting Rights Act prohibited many of the tactics that hindered Black voters from getting their voices heard. This was due to the establishment of the Fourteenth Amendment, which granted citizenship and equal rights to all African-Americans. The law of redistricting had to comply with this act in order for the minority group to have impact in the U.S. government. In addition, any affected American citizen that felt that they are being affected by the Voting Rights Act can file a lawsuit stating that it violates Section 2 of the Voting Rights Act which led rise to the case. However, racial gerrymandering continued past 1965 because it is extremely difficult to prove if districts were drawn on the basis of racial discrimination. This was apparent in the Thornburgh V. Gingles case of 1986 in which Black citizens of North Carolina argued that all white-majority districts were drawn up so a Black representative wouldn't get elected. In this unanimous decision, it was decided that districts did indeed dilute Black votes and therefore did violate the Voting Rights Act.

Case Background 
Janet Reno (appellant) was the 78th Attorney General. She was the first female US Attorney General, selected by President Clinton.

Ruth O. Shaw (appellee) was a white Democratic resident of the 12th district in North Carolina.

After the 1990 census, the North Carolina General Assembly was entitled to a 12th seat in the U.S. House of Representatives and redrew its congressional districts to account for the changes in population. This district would be North Carolina's second "majority-minority" district of majority Black voters. The North Carolina General Assembly submitted the plan to the U.S. Attorney General for preclearance under the Voting Rights Act, but it was rejected by the US Department of Justice which was led by Attorney General Janet Reno. Attorney General Janet Reno instructed the North Carolina state assembly to add another majority-minority district in order to comply with the recent amendments to the Voting Rights Act. In 1982, the Voting Rights Act was amended to target the decrease in a specific minority's ability to ever gain a voting majority. The state revised its map and submitted a new plan, this one with two majority-minority districts. The proposed 12th district was 160 miles (260 km) long, winding through the state to connect various areas having in common only a large Black population and cut through five counties which split into three voting districts. The new district was described in Supreme Court's opinion as "snake-like."

After the General Assembly passed legislation creating the second district, a group of White voters in North Carolina, led by Ruth O. Shaw, sued on the grounds that the district was an unconstitutional gerrymander. Shaw's group claimed that drawing districts based on race violated the equal protection clause of the Fourteenth Amendment.

The Voting Rights Act of 1965 lead to the rise of the Shaw v. Reno court case which allowed for more representation of the Black (minority) representation in the state of North Carolina. However, five White residents of North Carolina, opposed against the redrawing because of the oddly shaped district in which they also stated it violated their Equal Protection Rights. This case was unlike others since the Voting Right Act, because it now didn't hinder the redistricting and impediment of the minority groups. Now the claim was whether making a district based on race was racially adequate and fair for everyone.

An essential case, repeatedly referred to throughout the Shaw v. Reno case was the United Jewish Organizations of Williamsburg V. Carey case. A federal District Court dismissed a lawsuit by North Carolina voters on the grounds that they had no claim for relief under a standard set by the previous Supreme Court case, United Jewish Organizations of Williamsburgh v. Carey. With a 7-1 decision the court ruled in favor of Carey, the respondent. The United Jewish Organizations of Williamsburg claimed that the plan violated their constitutional rights because the districts had been assigned solely on a racial basis. The court found that the reapportionment plan was valid under the Constitution as the Fourteenth and the Fifteenth Amendment do not prohibit the use of racial factors in districting and apportionment.

Arguments

Shaw 
Shaw along with other five North Carolina residents filed an action against the state, declaring that the state had created an unconstitutional racial gerrymandering violating the Fourteenth Amendment. It was also argued that the racial gerrymandering hindered the voters from having a blind process of voting. This was a previous problem that discriminated against the minority voters however, the White residents thought it was hindering their voices racially. Then, the residents argued that the state had gone far this time by redrawing the district lines and creating a second district that was dominated by the minorities. Another argument that was made was the "snake-like" structure of the district and how it does not follow the reapportionment guidelines, which led to filling a lawsuit against both the state and federal government for political gerrymandering.

Reno 
Reno, the Attorney General, argued that the creation of the second district was necessary in order to follow the request of the General Assembly that required them to abide by the Voting Right Act of 1965, which would increase the representation of the minority groups and allow them to have more of a voice when voting. This was to designed to prevent any discrimination by race and North Carolina thought this plan was completely aligned with the request of the General Assembly guidelines. It included that the Supreme Court of the United States and the federal government that allowed states to find any possible way to comply to the Voting Rights Act of 1965, even if it meant having a strangely structured district like this one which Reno argued against.

Decision

Majority opinion
In a 5-4 decision the courts ruled in favor of Shaw (the petitioner), finding that it was, in fact, unlawful to gerrymander on the basis of race. Justice Sandra Day O'Connor wrote the majority opinion in which she explains the court's ruling. In it, she writes that the court found that the shape of North Carolina's 12th district was so “bizarre” that the only reasonable explanation was that it had been drawn on the basis of race. The courts also noted that based on the Voting Rights Act, race can be taken into account when redistricting plans are made, but it cannot be the sole factor when drawing a new district because that would violate the fourteenth amendment. Therefore, such redistricting was held unconstitutional since it found intention to segregate voters by race and this segregation cannot be justified under a standard of strict scrutiny.“Racial gerrymandering even for remedial purposes, may balkanize us into competing racial factions; it threatens to carry us further from the goal of a political system in which race no longer matters-a goal that the Fourteen and Fifteenth Amendments embody, and to which the Nation continues to aspire.” -Shaw, 509 U.S. at 657Additionally, it was noted that allowing the 12th district to be drawn in that manner would be setting a dangerous precedent in our democratic system in which we are attempting to reach equality. “Racial classifications of any sort pose the risk of lasting harm to our society. They reinforce the belief, held by too many for too much of our history, that individuals should be judged by the color of their skin” -Shaw, 509 U.S. at 657

Dissents

The dissenting opinion by Justice White held that Shaw failed to present cognizable harm or that for Shaw to bring this case there had to have been harm done to them one way or another and that this failed to be presented in court. Additionally, he noted the voting interests of those who brought the case had not been violated. He also stated that drawing districts on the basis of race could prove to be beneficial for minority communities.

The dissenting opinions from Justice Blackmun and Stevens also brought many of the same points as White and they also added that the purpose of the equal protection clause was only to protect those who have been historically discriminated against. Therefore, it should not apply to the White voters who brought this case.

Justice Souter noted the arbitrary nature of the strict scrutiny applied in this case. He detailed that the 12th district was ultimately drawn to benefit a minority group hence making the strict scrutiny applied to feel unreasonable.“The difference between constitutional and unconstitutional gerrymanders has nothing to do with whether they are based on assumptions about the groups they affect, but whether their purpose is to enhance the power of the group in control of the districting process at the expense of any minority group, and thereby to strengthen the unequal distribution of electoral power.” - Shaw, 509 U.S. at 678

Aftermath

Impact 
While Shaw intended to construct limitations on using race to gerrymander districts, it fell short to live up to those expectations. The Shaw v. Reno decision led to different interpretations as questions were left unanswered. The result of Shaw led to a mixed reaction and, soon after, lawsuits were filed against majority-Black districts in some southern states such as Florida, Georgia, and Louisiana. Shaw also does not add or address the criteria needed for creating districts. "Highly irregular" districts are called into question but Shaw does not unpack what that means. The impact of Shaw goes far beyond the case decision and has since paved the wave for future Supreme Court cases. Supreme Court cases, which build on Shaw, focus on majority-minority districts and try to answer if race can be used to redistrict districts. Grofman adds that he does not believe Shaw to be a game-changer, but he does emphasize that while their consequences might not be as far-reaching, its succeeding cases are. While Shaw failed to set clear criteria for gerrymandering, Shaw impacted the future of voting rights.The significance of the Shaw v. Reno decision is heavily debated but it is known that it had a lasting impact on how the Voting Rights Act was going to be enforced and the structure of the U.S. political system.

Related Cases 
In the aftermath of the Shaw v. Reno decision, the Supreme Court reexamined the topic of racial gerrymandering in the other court cases. In Bush v. Vera, the state of Texas planned to add additional congressional districts after the 1990 census. These redistricting measures were found to be unconstitutional and in the decision of this case, Justice Sandra Day O'Connor referred back to her opinion from Shaw v. Reno. She noted that under the standard of "strict scrutiny", the districts were irregularly shaped and used race as a deciding factor. The redistricting plans of this case were overturned and the overall decision aligned with that of the Shaw case. Likewise, Miller v. Johnson is another case that was influenced by Shaw. In Miller v. Johnson, Georgia's racial gerrymandering was questioned to violate the Equal Protection Clause, as it aimed to create a majority-Black district. Justices looked to Shaw v. Reno for guidance as they ruled on the legality of racial gerrymandering. Using the Shaw v. Reno decision, the justices decided that using racial reasons for redistricting is unconstitutional. Since Georgia's General Assembly used “race for its own sake and not other districting principles,” their actions were rendered unconstitutional.

Controversies 
There  have been controversies and misinterpretations associated with Shaw v. Reno. Shaw fails to give criteria for an irregular drawing. It is, therefore, unclear how to prove when a shape is bizarre enough to constitute a clear racial motive, making it hard for courts to decide on rulings. As a result, it is possible for courts to interpret Shaw differently. For example, a Georgia court ruled that a district of “average appearance” was invalidated, but North Carolina's snake-like shaped district which could be described as irregular was upheld. There are many discrepancies that each judge must take into account when using Shaw v. Reno as a precedent. In addition to being unclear, Shaw has the ability to disenfranchise minorities. In Reynold v. Sims, the phrase “people, not trees of pastures, vote” can be applied to Shaw, as people, not highways, vote. Despite this, voter rights are being controlled by district shapes in the redistricting process. Shaw v. Reno places a lot of importance on the actual lines drawn, rather than who they contain. This outlook has the potential to disenfranchise minorities, as courts may place more importance on the shape of the district, rather than the underrepresented people.

See also
 Wesberry v. Sanders, : Earlier Georgia congressional redistricting case
 Wright v. Rockefeller, 
 Miller v. Johnson, 
 Bush v. Vera, 
 Hunt v. Cromartie, 
 Easley v. Cromartie, 
 Georgia v. Ashcroft, :  Georgia State Senate redistricting case
 League of United Latin American Citizens v. Perry, 
 Alabama Legislative Black Caucus v. Alabama, 
 List of United States Supreme Court cases, volume 509

Further reading

Whitaker, L. Paige (April 13, 2015). "Congressional Redistricting and the Voting Rights Act: A Legal Overview". Congressional Research Service.

References

External links
 
 Google Scholar

United States equal protection case law
United States Supreme Court cases
United States Supreme Court cases of the Rehnquist Court
United States electoral redistricting case law
1993 in United States case law
Gerrymandering in the United States
Congressional districts of North Carolina
African-American history of North Carolina
Legal history of North Carolina